Charles Morrell "Chuck" Jordan (October 21, 1927 – December 9, 2010) was an American automotive designer who was born in Whittier, California.  

Jordan is widely known for his work on the 1959-1960 Cadillac Eldorado and the 1992 Cadillac Seville STS — and his role as vice president of design for General Motors from 1986 to 1992.

Background
Noted for sketching during school classes, as young as age eight, Jordan graduated with honors from Fullerton Union High School in 1945, studying at MIT before joining GM in 1949.  

Jordan died in December 2010 in Rancho Santa Fe, California of lymphoma, survived by his wife Sally, two daughters, and son, Mark Jordan, a designer for GM and Mazda.

Career
While a junior at MIT, Chuck entered the first post war Fisher Body Craftsman's Guild competition, winning first prize and a $4000 scholarship. At the award ceremony, Chuck later accepted an invitation from Harley Earl's assistant Howard O'Leary, who invited him to come to GM when he completed his studies. The acceptance of the invitation led to Chuck beginning his career at GM in 1949.

One of his first projects was the Aerotrain, completed when he was 28 years old.  He rose to director of design for Cadillac in 1957, being chief designer of the 1959 Cadillac, an epitome of fin design (although it was well underway when he arrived.) He also spent time with GM Europe as head of design for Opel. 

He was vice president of design for General Motors from 1986 to 1992.  Only six people, including Harley Earl and Ed Welburn, have held the position in GM's history.

Jordan's design work includes:
 1959-1960 Cadillac
 1968-1973 Opel GT
 1971-1975 Opel Manta A
 1971-1975 Opel Ascona A
 1973-1977 Opel Commodore B
 1991-1996 Oldsmobile 98 
 1992-1994 Chevrolet K1500 Blazer/GMC K1500 Jimmy 
 1992-1997 Cadillac Seville STS
 1992-1999 Chevrolet Suburban/GMC Suburban
 1993-1996 Cadillac Fleetwood  
 1994-1999 Cadillac DeVille
 1995-2001 Chevrolet Lumina
 1995-2005  Chevrolet Cavalier

References

External links

1927 births
2010 deaths
People from Whittier, California
American automobile designers
General Motors designers
Opel designers
Deaths from lymphoma
20th-century American businesspeople